Puzhayamma is a 2021 Indian Malayalam-language film produced by Gokulam Gopalan and directed by Vijeesh Mani. The film is completely shot in a river. Puzhayamma, based on River pollution, is an environmental film. The movie was released through JioCinema on July 1, 2021 

The calamitous 2018 Kerala floods  play a major role in this film.

Plot
Puzhayamma is based on the friendship between a 13-year-old girl Baby Meenakshi and an American tourist Linda Arsenio and the hurdles they had to face, when they tried to save a polluted river.

Cast
Baby Meenakshi
Linda Arsenio
Thampi Antony
Prakash Chengal
Unni Raja
Ashly Boban
KPAC Leelakrishnan
Roji P. Kurian
Sanil Paingadan 
Master Virat Vijeesh
Fatima Al Mansoori
Acharya Praveen Chauhan

References

External links
 

2020s Malayalam-language films
Indian disaster films